Shabanluy-e Olya (also Romanized as Sha‘bānlūy-e ‘Olyā; also known as Bīlehverdī and Pīleh Verdī) is a village in Rahal Rural District, in the Central District of Khoy County, West Azerbaijan Province, Iran. At the 2006 census, its population was 267, in 70 families.

References 

Populated places in Khoy County